Willie Albert Williams (born December 29, 1941) is a former American football defensive back in the National Football League (NFL) for the New York Giants, as well as the Oakland Raiders of the American Football League (AFL). He led the NFL in interceptions in 1968, and was selected to the Pro Bowl the following season.  Williams played college football at Grambling State University and was drafted in the eighth round of the 1965 NFL Draft. After playing nine seasons with the NFL and the AFL, Williams played two seasons with The Hawaiians of the World Football League in 1974 and 1975.

References

1941 births
Living people
American football defensive backs
Grambling State Tigers football players
New York Giants players
Oakland Raiders players
Players of American football from Atlanta
Eastern Conference Pro Bowl players
American Football League players